Jan Mirza may refer to:
 Jan Mirza, South Khorasan